Magherini is an Italian surname. Notable people with the surname include:

Graziella Magherini (born 1927), Italian psychiatrist
Guido Magherini (born 1951), Italian footballer and manager

See also
Mogherini

Italian-language surnames